Tazehabad-e Kord Sara Kuh (also Romanized as Tāzehābād-e Kord Sarā Kūh) is a village in Otaqvar Rural District, Otaqvar District, Langarud County, Gilan Province, Iran. At the 2006 census, its population was 458, in 123 families.

References 

Populated places in Langarud County